Bombus genalis is a species of bumblebee.

References

Bumblebees
Insects described in 1918